The Copa del Generalísimo 1949 Final was the 47th final of the King's Cup. The final was played at Estadio Chamartín in Madrid, on 29 May 1949, being won by Valencia CF, who beat Atlético de Bilbao 1-0.

Details

References

1949
Copa
Valencia CF matches
Athletic Bilbao matches